Trachoma stellatum, commonly known as the starry spectral orchid, is an epiphytic or lithophytic clump-forming orchid with many thick roots. It has between three and eight thick, leathery leaves and many short-lived, cream-coloured flowers with purple markings and a yellow-tipped labellum. This orchid occurs in tropical North Queensland.

Description
Up to ten flowers are open at the same time. Flowering occurs from March to July.

Taxonomy and naming
Trachoma stellatum was first formally described in 1989 by David Jones, Bruce Gray, Mark Clements and Jeffrey Wood and the description was published in Australian Orchid Research. The specific epithet (stellatum) is a Latin word meaning "starred" or "starry".

Distribution and habitat
The starry spectral orchid grows on rainforest trees and in humid places near rainforest edges.

References

stellatum
Orchids of Australia
Plants described in 1989